Plainview is an unincorporated community in Cleona and Hickory Grove Townships, Scott County, Iowa, United States.

Demographics

History
Plainview's population was 27 in 1902, and 225 in 1925.

Plainview was an incorporated community until 1987.

References

Unincorporated communities in Scott County, Iowa
Unincorporated communities in Iowa